Sobhanachala Studios was an Indian film production company which produced films predominantly in Telugu cinema. It was one of the earliest first studios owned by a Telugu person in Madras (now Chennai). The studio was located in Teynampet, Madras. Mirzapuram Raja (Meka Venkatramaiah Appa Rao Bahadur) who had earlier produced films on the "Jaya Films" banner has established Sobhanachala Studios in 1941. The studio was notable for introducing scores of technicians and artists to Telugu cinema. Notable people introduced to the Telugu film industry by the studio were Anjali Devi (Gollabhama), N. T. Rama Rao (Mana Desam), Ghantasala (Lakshmamma) etc.

Its first film was Daksha Yagnam (1941). Some of the most notable films produced by the studio are Gollabhama (1947), Keelu Gurram(1949), Mana Desam (1949), Lakshmamma (1950) and Tilottama (1951). The studio produced many notable films in the early history of Telugu talkie cinema in the 1940s. However, with the opening of Vauhini Studios, the pace of Sobhanahala's movie production has reduced. The studio changed the hands to a new owner in 1955 and got re-branded as Venus Studios. After functioning for over a decade, Venus Studios was defunct in the 1950s.

Filmography 
Films produced on Jaya Films banner:

 Jarasandha (1938)
 Mahananda (1939)
 Bhoja Kalidasu (1940)
 Jeevana Jyothi (1940)

Films produced on Sobhanachala Pictures banner:

Daksha Yagnam (1941)
Bhishma (1944)
Gollabhama (1947)
Mahathma Udangar (1947)
Madalasa (1948)
Keelu Gurram (1949)
Mana Desam (1949)
Lakshmamma (1950)
Tilottama (1951)
 Gramapennu (1951) (Tamil)
Prajaseva (1952)
Saavasam (1952)

References 

Indian film producers
Film production companies of India
Indian film studios
Telugu film producers
1941 establishments in India